Alexander Sforza or Alessandro Sforza (1658–1701) was a Roman Catholic prelate who served as Titular Archbishop of Neocaesarea in Ponto (1695–1701) and Apostolic Nuncio to Savoy (1695–1701).

Biography
Alexander Sforza was born in Viterbo, Italy on 6 August 1658.
On 13 June 1695, he was appointed during the papacy of Pope Innocent XII as Titular Archbishop of Neocaesarea in Ponto.
On 19 June 1695, he was consecrated bishop by Galeazzo Marescotti, Cardinal-Priest of Santi Quirico e Giulitta, with Prospero Bottini, Titular Archbishop of Myra, and Sperello Sperelli, Bishop of Terni, serving as co-consecrators.
On 24 Jun 1695, he was named Apostolic Nuncio to Savoy.
He served as Apostolic Nuncio to Savoy until his death on 8 Apr 1701.

While bishop, he was the principal consecrator of Michel-Gabriel Rossillon de Bernex, Bishop of Genève (1697).

References

External links and additional sources
 (for Chronology of Bishops) 

17th-century Roman Catholic titular bishops
18th-century Roman Catholic titular bishops
Bishops appointed by Pope Innocent XII
1658 births
1701 deaths
Apostolic Nuncios to Savoy